Pompeo Giustiniani (1569–1616) was an Italian military commander and author.

Life
Giustiniani was born in 1569 in Ajaccio. He started his military career when he was only fourteen years old. In 1602, during the Siege of Ostend, he was promoted Maestre de campo in the Army of Flanders. Thanks to his military experience, he wrote Delle guerre di Fiandra (published in Antwerp by Joachim Trognaesius in 1609). He lost an arm in these conflicts and, from the artificial limb that he wore, came to be known by the sobriquet .

In 1613 he entered service in the Venetian army. During the Uskok War, Giustiniani argued with other officials because of his promises of victory. In 1616 he besieged Gradisca, but he had to withdraw because the Habsburg forces were too strong. On 10 October 1616, he died in battle at Lucinico. He was buried in Venice, at the church of San Moisè.

Works
 Delle guerre di Fiandra, Antwerp, 1609
 reprinted Venice, 1612 (on Google Books)
 reprinted Milan, 1615 (on Google Books)

References

1569 births
1616 deaths
Italian soldiers
Italian military writers
Military personnel of the Eighty Years' War
Republic of Venice military personnel killed in action
Pompeo